Saint Ida may refer to several Catholic saints:

 Itta (died 652), wife of Pepin of Landen and mother of Saint Begga
 Saint Ita (also known as Ida), an Irish nun
 Ida of Herzfeld (c. 788–813), widow of a Saxon duke
 Ida of Lorraine (1040–1113)